The list of best-selling Nintendo Entertainment System video games totals 75 games with sales or shipments of at least one million copies. The Nintendo Entertainment System (NES) video game console was first packaged as the Family Computer (Famicom) in Japan. Its best-selling game is Super Mario Bros., first released in Japan on September 13, 1985, with sales of more than 40million copies worldwide, making it one of the best-selling video game of all time. Two sequels are within the top five best-selling NES games: Super Mario Bros. 2 ranks fourth at 7.46million units, and Super Mario Bros. 3 ranks third at 18million units. The remaining top five are Duck Hunt with 28million units and The Legend of Zelda with 6.5million units.

Of these 75 games, 31 were developed by internal Nintendo development divisions, and 41 were published by Nintendo. Other developers with the most million-selling games include Capcom with seven games, and Konami, Hudson Soft, and Tose, with six games each. Other publishers include Capcom with seven games, Konami with six games, Bandai and Hudson Soft with five games each, and Enix and Namco with four games each. The most popular franchises on NES include Super Mario with 67.63million combined units, Dragon Quest with 11.475million combined units, and The Legend of Zelda with 10.89million combined units.

Games

Notes

References

External links
 

Nintendo Entertainment System
Best-selling Nintendo Entertainment System video games